An antenna rotator (or antenna rotor) is a device used to change the orientation, within the horizontal plane, of a directional antenna. Most antenna rotators have two parts, the rotator unit and the controller. The controller is normally placed near the equipment which the antenna is connected to, while the rotator is mounted on the antenna mast directly below the antenna.

Rotators are commonly used in amateur radio and military communications installations. They are also used with TV and FM antennas, where stations are available from multiple directions, as the cost of a rotator is often significantly less than that of installing a second antenna to receive stations from multiple directions.

Rotators are manufactured for different sizes of antennas and installations. For example, a consumer TV antenna rotator has enough torque to turn a TV/FM or small ham antenna. These units typically cost around US$70 .

Heavy-duty ham rotators are designed to turn extremely large, heavy, high frequency (shortwave) beam antennas, and cost hundreds or possibly thousands of dollars.

In the center of the reference picture, the accompanying image includes an AzEl installation rotator, so named for its controlling of both the azimuth and the elevation components of the direction of an antenna system or array. Such antenna configurations are used in, for example, amateur-radio satellite]] or moon-bounce communications.

An open hardware AzEl rotator system is provided by the SatNOGS Groundstation project.

Manufacturers of consumer TV antenna rotators

Past
Before the era of cable TV and the rise of satellite TV, many homes had outdoor antennas designed to capture over-the-air television signals.  The rotator market was served by a number of manufacturers including 
The Alliance Manufacturing Co., Inc., Alliance, Ohio
Radio Shack
Channel Master 
The Radiart Corp., Cleveland, Ohio
Cornell-Dubilier Corporation, South Plainfield, New Jersey
RCA
Sears, Roebuck and Co.
American Phenolic Corporation
Leader Electronics, Inc., Cleveland, Ohio
Gemini Industries, Inc., Passaic, New Jersey
Philco
Lance Industries, Sylmar, California
Philips
Pro Brand International, Inc. (Eagle Aspen brand)
Zenith
Alinco Electronics, Inc.
Radio Merchandise Sales, Inc.
Kenpro
Nippon Antenna
Stolle
Hy-Gain

Current
Although the cord-cutting movement has increased interest in receiving free over-the-air television signals, as of December 2021 consumer options are limited.  
VOXX Accessories Corporation of Carmel, Indiana, a wholly-owned subsidiary of VOXX International, using the RCA trademark, offers a remote-controlled antenna rotator, the model VH226E.
Channel Master's stock of model CM-9521HD is depleted, and it is unclear whether more units will be manufactured.

Antennas